Fatma Bouri (born 9 January 1993) is a Tunisian handball player for Club Africain and the Tunisian national team.

She participated at the 2017 World Women's Handball Championship.

References

1993 births
Living people
Tunisian female handball players
Mediterranean Games competitors for Tunisia
Competitors at the 2022 Mediterranean Games
21st-century Tunisian women
20th-century Tunisian women